Regional elections were held in Denmark in March 1909. 9897 municipal council members were elected.

References

1909
Denmark
Elections
March 1909 events